Luca Szekerczés (born 18 June 1994) is a Hungarian handballer who plays for Szombathelyi KKA.

Individual awards 
 Hungarian Handball Federation Best Female Youth Player : 2012
 All-Star Right Back of the Junior European Championship: 2013
 All-Star Right Back of the Junior World Championship: 2014 
 Best Young Player of the EHF Champions League: 2016
 Handball-Planet.com World Young Female All-Star Team: 2015-16

References

1994 births
Living people
People from Bonyhád
Ferencvárosi TC players (women's handball)
Siófok KC players
Hungarian female handball players
Expatriate handball players
Hungarian expatriate sportspeople in Germany
Sportspeople from Tolna County